Westford Center Historic District encompasses the historic village center of Westford, Massachusetts.  It is centered on a stretch of Main Street between Graniteville and Leland Roads, extending away from this strip on a number of side streets.  The area has been the town center since settlement of the town began in the 1720s.  Prominent in the district are the Westford Academy building and the First Parish Church, two fine Federal style structures built in 1794, and the Italianate town hall, built in 1871.

The district was listed on the National Register of Historic Places in 1998.

See also
National Register of Historic Places listings in Middlesex County, Massachusetts

References

Historic districts in Westford, Massachusetts
National Register of Historic Places in Middlesex County, Massachusetts
Historic districts on the National Register of Historic Places in Massachusetts